Banting is a town in Malaysia.

Banting may also refer to:
 Banting (state constituency), a state constituency in Malaysia
 Frederick Banting (1891–1941), Canadian medical scientist, co-discoverer of insulin
 William Banting (1797–1878), eminent English undertaker, who wrote Letter on Corpulence, Addressed to the Public (1863)
 Banting, a British, informal, archaic term  for dieting, especially a low-carbohydrate dieting method (avoiding sugar, saccharine matter, starch, beer), derived from the name of William Banting, who popularised the diet. Wiktionary has a definition: wiktionary:banting
 Banting (crater), a lunar crater
 Banting University, a fictional university in Degrassi: The Next Generation